The Emergency Wetlands Reserve Program (EWRP), authorized in 1993 under emergency supplemental appropriations to respond to widespread floods in the Midwest, provided payments to purchase easements and partial financial assistance to landowners who permanently restored wetlands at sites where the restoration costs exceeded the land’s fair market value.  EWRP was administered by Natural Resources Conservation Service as part of its Emergency Watershed Program and operated in seven Midwestern states. Land in this program is considered to be a part of the land enrolled in the Wetland Reserve Program.

References 

Wetlands of the United States
United States Department of Agriculture programs